Ronny Marcelo Santos Mendoza (born 4 July 1995) is an Ecuadorian professional footballer who plays as a defender.

Career
Mendoza played the 2013 season with Manta FC, before trialling with Major League Soccer where he was drafted 62nd in the 2014 MLS SuperDraft by FC Dallas, but the club opted against signing him and he returned to Manta.

References

External links

1995 births
Living people
People from Manabí Province
Association football defenders
Ecuadorian footballers
Manta F.C. footballers
FC Dallas draft picks